Bakreshwar is a village in Dubrajpur CD Block in Suri Sadar subdivision of Birbhum district in the Indian state of West Bengal. Bakreshwar Thermal Power Station of West Bengal Power Development Corporation Limited and Bakreswar Thermal Power Plant Township are located some distance away from this town. The nearest railway station of Bakreshwar is Siuri.

Etymology
The word Bakreshwar comes from the name of Lord Shiva worshipped in the locality. Bakra (Vakra) means bent or curved. Ishwar means God. Mythologically it is said that in Satya Yuga during the marriage ceremony of Lakshmi and Narayan, Ashtavakra Muni (then known as Subrata Muni) was insulted by Indra. The muni was so enraged that he developed 8 cripples in his body (Ashtavakra Muni means a sage with 8 curved cripples, probably kyphoscoliotic). Ashtavakra Muni was blessed by lord Shiva here after many years of Tapashya (meditation).
This place is also famous as one of the 51 Shakti Pithas where there is a temple dedicated to Adi Shakti. This is a major pilgrimage spot for Hindus.

Geography

Location
It has an average elevation of 84 metres (276 feet).

Bakreshwar River flows beside the town.

Hot springs and temples
Bakreshwar is also a place of geological interest with many hot springs. There are ten hot springs here. They are :
 Paphara ganga.
 Baitarini ganga.
 Khar kunda : The water in this spring is of 66 degrees Celsius.
 Bhairav kunda : The water in this spring is of 65 degrees Celsius.
 Agni kunda : Agni means fire. The water in this spring is at 80 degrees Celsius. It is also rich in many minerals of sodium, potassium, calcium, silicates, chlorides, bicarbonates and sulphates which are said to have medicinal properties. It might also contain traces of radioactive elements.
 Dudh kunda : Dudh means milk. The water of this spring attains a dull white hue during early morning probably due to ozone concentration. The water in this spring is at 66 degrees Celsius.
 Surya kunda : Surya means sun. The water in this spring is of 61 degrees Celsius.
 Shwet ganga.
 Brahma kunda.
 Amrita kunda.

Temples at Bakreswar:
 Ma Bhavatarini Mandir (Temple)
 Bakreswar Temple (Main Temple)
 Mahisasur Mardini (Temple)
 Bhairabnath Temple

Bakreswar picture gallery

Economy
West Bengal Power Development Corporation Limited (WBPDCL) operates 5 × 210 MW Bakreshwar Thermal Power Station. It is located near Chinpai off Panagarh–Morgram Highway

Healthcare
There is a primary health centre at Bakreshwar with 6 beds.

References

External links
 
 Bakreshwar
 Satellite view

Villages in Birbhum district
Hot springs of India
Landforms of West Bengal
Tourist attractions in Birbhum district